The Stars Are All New Songs is a studio album by Danish jazz guitarist Jakob Bro.

Track listing 

All tracks composed by Jakob Bro

"Sound Flower"
"Origin"
"The Boy From Saladan"
"Romantics"
"Duke Ellington Boulevard"
"Waltzing Trees"
"Reconstructing A Dream"
"Drumscapes"
"Eugeine"

Line up 

Bill Frisell - Guitar
Kurt Rosenwinkel - Guitar (7)
Jakob Bro - Guitar
Chris Cheek - Tenor Sax
Mark Turner - Tenor Sax
Jesper Zeuthen - Alto Sax
Andrew D'Angelo - Bass Clarinet
Ben Street - Bass
Paul Motian - Drums

References 

2008 albums
Jakob Bro albums